Propalosoma is an extinct genus of ants in the family Formicidae, containing a single species Propalosoma gutierrezae, known from the Eocene aged Klondike Mountain Formation in Washington State. The genus was originally placed in the wasp family Rhopalosomatidae, but moved to the ant subfamily Myrmeciinae by Archibald et al in 2018.

References

Hymenoptera genera

Prehistoric insect genera